Si Narong is a district (amphoe) of Surin province, northeastern Thailand.

History
The minor district (king amphoe) was established on 1 April 1995 with five tambons split from Sangkha district.

On 15 May 2007, all 81 minor districts were upgraded to full districts. On 24 August the upgrade became official.

Geography
Neighboring districts are (from the south clockwise): Sangkha, Lamduan and Sikhoraphum of Surin Province, Prang Ku and Khukhan of Sisaket province.

Administration
The district is divided into five sub-districts (tambons), which are further subdivided into 62 villages (mubans). There are no municipal (thesaban) areas. There are five tambon administrative organizations (TAO).

References

External links
amphoe.com

Si Narong